"¿Qué Creías?" ("What Did You Think?") is a song by American singer Selena, taken from her third studio album, Entre a Mi Mundo (1992). It was written by Pete Astudillo and A.B. Quintanilla following A.B.'s challenge for Astudillo to write a song before arriving in Las Vegas from California. Astudillo decided on writing a track inspired by works done by Mexican singer Juan Gabriel. A mariachi ballad, the song was described by Selena as a song that speaks for all women. It is the singer's torch song and the lyrics describe Selena's unwillingness to forgive a cheating partner; she addresses her former lover who took her for granted, telling him that she can live without him. Critics praised Selena's emotive vocal range and female style of lyricism.

"¿Qué Creías?" peaked at number 14 on the US Billboard Hot Latin Songs chart, and has since been certified gold (Latin) by the Recording Industry Association of America (RIAA). In her live performances of the song, Selena often asked for a male volunteer to portray her former lover on stage, scorching them as the wronged partner. This was dramatized by Christian Serratos in the Netflix two-part limited drama Selena: The Series (2020). Alicia Villareal performed the song during the benefit concert Selena ¡VIVE! (2005).

Background and production 
"¿Qué Creías?" was written in its entirety in the back of a car by backup vocalist Pete Astudillo and Selena's brother and music producer A.B. Quintanilla. Oftentimes, their tour bus broke down, rendering the crew to travel long distances in three vehicles. Astudillo, A.B., and keyboardist Joe Ojeda would share a vehicle whenever the bus broke down. Band manager and father of Selena and A.B., Abraham Quintanilla insisted on stops to Las Vegas, whenever traveling back from California. During one particular trip back from California, A.B. challenged Astudillo with the idea of writing a song before they arrived in Las Vegas. When they arrived, Astudillo had written two verses that were greatly inspired by Mexican singer Juan Gabriel. He wanted a song that would enable Selena to "really sink her teeth into and really let it roar". The group's guitarist Chris Perez recalled that Selena recorded the song quickly.

Music and lyrics 
Musically, "¿Qué Creías?" is a mariachi ballad and a torch song. It draws influences from historical boleros of northern Mexico, conjunto (small band) styles, ranchera, and Andalusian copla that connects the culture of Latin America back to Spain. "¿Qué Creías?" includes seven major chords and a stretched instrumentation in its song structure. Tejano singer David Lee Garza lent his "soulful" accordion-style on the track. Lyrically, Selena paints herself as a wronged woman who angrily tells her lover off, reminding female listeners of how men take them for granted. At the beginning of the song, Selena tells her former love interest to leave, letting him know he would be mistaken into believing that she would forgive him of his wrongdoing, confessing she can live without him. Biographer Joe Nick Patoski writes how Selena "scorches" her former lover who took her for granted. Selena's "lack of restraint" emotive vocal range and lyrics echo the "gritty passion" of Lucha Villa, showcasing her as a "dramatic ballad singer".

Reception 
Elsa Nidia Barrett of the Tucson Citizen found the lyrics to have resonated with her, particularly the part about telling off a cheating boyfriend "with such aplomb". Richard Torres of Newsday believed Selena's emotional delivery in songs such as "¿Qué Creías?" and "Tú, Sólo Tú" (1995) turned them into successful singles. He particularly enjoyed the "extra throb in [Selena's] throat" as "truly heartrending". Musicologist and author John Storm Roberts believed "¿Qué Creías?" lacks the "thousand octane and ten-Kleenex passion of a Lola Beltrán". He continued that the song has enough of the Mexican "pop-ranchera shameless (and superb) emotionalism to get by even south of the border". Robert ended his review that his comments were not to "devalue her singing and star quality". Elijah Wald of The New York Times believed "¿Qué Creías?" is proof that Selena is able to sing in "deepest form" while "making it her own". Wald found Selena's delivery as a "ferocious passion of a classic Mexican diva". "¿Qué Creías?" is a "kiss-off anthem", that Selena said speaks "for all the ladies". Patoski called it "all sass and fire", finding the track peculiar to Selena's repertoire of cumbia music. Steve Webb of the Lakeland Ledger found that it showcases a singer "who aspires to be something more musically".

In a music report for New York, "¿Qué Creías?" was the fourth most-played song in the state. It received extensive airplay in various locations, including Austin and Houston. It was the eighth most-played song on Tejano radio stations in Texas. "¿Qué Creías?" entered at number 38 on the US Billboard Hot Latin Songs chart on the week ending November 28, 1992. In its second week, it rose to number 30 on the chart, though fell to number 32 in its third week. During its fourth week, "¿Qué Creías?" fell to number 33. In its fifth week, "¿Qué Creías?" rose to number 27 for two consecutive weeks. The song rose to number 26, to number 24 for the week of January 16, 1993, and number 19 the week after. It reached number 18 the following week, before peaking at number 14 on the issue dated February 6, 1993. "¿Qué Creías?" remained on the Hot Latin Songs chart for an additional four weeks before falling off, lasting 14 weeks on the chart. "¿Qué Creías?" debuted and peaked at number 10 on the US Billboard Latin Digital Song Sales chart on the tracking week of December 16, 2020. The song was certified gold (Latin) in 2017 by the Recording Industry Association of America (RIAA), which denotes 30,000 units consisted of sales and on-demand streaming in the United States.

Promotion and media appearances 
During the aftershow of the 1993 Tejano Music Awards in March, Selena talked about preparations for making a music video for "¿Qué Creías?" in Nuevo Leon. In September 1992, EMI Latin booked Selena for a press conference in Monterrey, Mexico, aiming to capitalize on the growing popularity of "¿Qué Creías?" and Entre a Mi Mundo, which became the first album by Selena to appeal to audiences in Mexico. The CD single included "La Llamada", serving as the a-side to "¿Qué Creías?". During her live performances of "¿Qué Creías?", Selena would often seek out a male volunteer on stage to portray her ex-boyfriend, scolding them while she portrays a wronged woman. Gus Garcia of the Del Rio News-Herald wrote how A.B. composes songs that deal with real-life situations and that Selena is able to convey the message in "¿Qué Creías?" during her performances by asking for young men to play the role of her former lover. Wald found Selena's performances of the song as "paying tribute to tradition while comically asserting her independence from it". Selena's performance of "¿Qué Creías?" on the Johnny Canales Show in 1994, in which Canales portrayed her ex-lover, was later released as part of the host's "favorite songs" on DVD. 

In 2005, Alicia Villarreal performed the song during the benefit concert Selena ¡VIVE!. In 2020, Christian Serratos portrayed Selena in the Netflix two-part limited drama Selena: The Series. Serratos said filming the concert scene of "¿Qué Creías?" was her favorite part because of the ability Selena had in making people in her concerts feel as though "they were all hanging out together as friends". She had rewatched Selena's performances of the song in preparation, calling a particular performance of the song by Selena "just so badass" because of her heavy confidence.

Credits and personnel 
Credits are adapted from the liner notes of Entre a Mi Mundo.

 Selena – vocals
 A.B. Quintanilla – producer, songwriter, programming, arranger, mixing
 Pete Astudillo – songwriter
 Brian "Red" Moore – engineer, mix engineer

 Ricky Vela – keyboards
 Joe Ojeda – keyboards
 David Lee Garza – accordion

Charts and certification

Weekly charts

Certification

References

Sources

External links 
 

 
1990s ballads
1992 singles
Spanish-language songs
Selena songs
Songs written by A. B. Quintanilla
Songs written by Pete Astudillo
Song recordings produced by A. B. Quintanilla
Ranchera songs
Boleros
Torch songs
Songs with feminist themes